Julia Melissa "Jia" Morado-De Guzman (born May 10, 1995) is a Filipino volleyball player. She was a member of the Ateneo Lady Eagles and was team's captain in the UAAP Season 79 Women's Volleyball tournament. In 2018 Jia was also a member of the Philippines Women's National Volleyball Team.

Career
She also played in the 2012 Palarong Pambansa and led the NCR Team to a championship, where she also won the Best Setter award.

Morado was the setter of the Philippine team for the 2015 Asian Women's U23 Volleyball Championship and in the 2015 Southeast Asian Games. She was Ateneo Lady Eagles team captain for the UAAP Season 79.

On May 6, 2017, Morado announced that she will not be returning to the Ateneo Lady Eagles in UAAP Season 80. On June 17, 2017, ABS-CBN Sports announced that Morado will join the Creamline Cool Smashers as part of the team's build up for the inaugural Premier Volleyball League All-Filipino Conference. She worked as Ateneo Lady Eagles assistant coach during the Premier Volleyball League 1st Season Collegiate Conference.

Morado won the most valuable player award in the 2017 Battle of the Rivals. She won the best setter award in the 2017 Premier Volleyball League Open Conference.

In 2018, together with her team, the Creamline Cool Smashers, won the championship of the 2018 Premier Volleyball League Reinforced Conference and was awarded best setter and finals' Most Valuable Player. And at the end of the 2018 PVL season, Jia won the back-to-back championships, best setter and finals' most valuable player awards.

Personal life
Morado was born in Manila to Ariel and Hedy Morado. She has three siblings, two sisters and one brother. All the girls played varsity-level volleyball. An older sister, Jessica Katrina, who also played for the Ateneo Women's Volleyball Team from 2007 to 2012, was the one who convinced the younger Jia to pursue volleyball. Her other older sister, Jamie Marielle, played for the UST Golden Tigresses volleyball team as a libero. Her brother, Ariel Jr. "Bok", also plays volleyball as a setter for Ateneo de Manila Men's Volleyball Team. Upon pursuing volleyball, she became a multi-awarded athlete and a full-time student at the Ateneo de Manila University where she graduated with degree of BS in Psychology. She graduated high school at the Colegio San Agustin – Makati.

She is married to Miguel De Guzman on November 11, 2021, after being in a relationship for six years. De Guzman is a businessman who was a former baseball player for De La Salle Santiago Zobel School. They both attended Ateneo de Manila University.

Awards

Individuals
 2011 NCR Volleyball Meet "Best Setter"
 2012 BEST Center Women’s Volleyball League "Best Setter"
 2012 Shakey’s Girls Volleyball League "Best Setter"
 2012 NCR Palarong Panrehiyon "Best Setter"
 2012 NCR Palarong Panrehiyon "Most Valuable Player"
 2012 Palarong Pambansa "Best Setter"
 2013 Shakey’s Girls Volleyball League "Best Setter"
 2015 UAAP Season 77 "Best Setter"
 2016 Shakey's V-League 13th Season Collegiate Conference "Best Setter"
 2017 Battle of the Rivals "Most Valuable Player"
 2017 Premier Volleyball League 1st Season Open Conference "Best Setter"
 2018 Premier Volleyball League Reinforced Conference "Best Setter"
 2018 Premier Volleyball League Reinforced Conference "Finals' Most Valuable Player"
 2018 Premier Volleyball League Open Conference "Best Setter"
 2018 Premier Volleyball League Open Conference "Finals' Most Valuable Player"
 2019 Premier Volleyball League Reinforced Conference "Best Setter"
 2019 Premier Volleyball League Open Conference "Best Setter"
 2019 Premier Volleyball League Open Conference "Finals Most Valuable Player"
 2021 Premier Volleyball League Open Conference "Best Setter"
 2022 Premier Volleyball League Reinforced Conference "Best Setter"

Collegiate
 2014 UAAP Season 76 volleyball tournaments –  Champions, with Ateneo De Manila University Lady Eagles
 2014 Shakey's V-League 12th Season Collegiate Conference –  Silver medal, with Ateneo De Manila University Lady Eagles
 2014 ASEAN University Games Volleyball 2014 –  Bronze medal, with Ateneo De Manila University Lady Eagles
 2015 UAAP Season 77 volleyball tournaments –  Champions, with Ateneo De Manila University Lady Eagles
 2016 UAAP Season 78 volleyball tournaments –  Silver medal, with Ateneo De Manila University Lady Eagles
 2016 Shakey's V-League 13th Season Collegiate Conference –  Silver medal, with Ateneo De Manila University Lady Eagles
 2016 ASEAN University Games Volleyball 2016 –  Bronze medal, with Ateneo De Manila University Lady Eagles
 2017 UAAP Season 79 volleyball tournaments –  Silver medal, with Ateneo De Manila University Lady Eagles

Club
 2017 Premier Volleyball League Open Conference –  Third place, with Creamline Cool Smashers
 2018 Premier Volleyball League Reinforced Conference –  Champions, with Creamline Cool Smashers
 2018 Premier Volleyball League Open Conference –  Champions, with Creamline Cool Smashers
 2019 Premier Volleyball League Reinforced Conference –  Runner-up, with Creamline Cool Smashers
 2019 Premier Volleyball League Open Conference –  Champions, with Creamline Cool Smashers
 2021 Premier Volleyball League Open Conference –  Runner-up, with Creamline Cool Smashers
 2022 Premier Volleyball League Open Conference -  Champions, with Creamline Cool Smashers
 2022 Premier Volleyball League Invitational Conference -  Champions, with Creamline Cool Smashers
 2022 Premier Volleyball League Reinforced Conference -  Third place, with Creamline Cool Smashers

References

Living people
1995 births
People from Parañaque
Volleyball players from Metro Manila
University Athletic Association of the Philippines volleyball players
Ateneo de Manila University alumni
Setters (volleyball)
Philippines women's international volleyball players
Filipino women's volleyball players
Volleyball players at the 2018 Asian Games
Competitors at the 2019 Southeast Asian Games
Asian Games competitors for the Philippines
Southeast Asian Games competitors for the Philippines